Hanne Hegh (born 27 April 1960 in Oslo) is a Norwegian team handball player and Olympic medalist.

Playing career
Hanne Hegh was captain on the first Norway national team winning a medal in an international championship, the bronze medal at the 1986 World Women's Handball Championship. She received a silver medal at the 1988 Summer Olympics in Seoul with the Norwegian national team. Hanne Hegh played 202 games for the national team between 1979 and 1990, scoring 361 goals.

Trainer
She was educated at Norges idrettshøgskole. From 1997 to 2010 Hanne Hegh was on the training squad of the Norway men's national handball team. Today she is a teacher at Grenland Folkehøgskole in Porsgrunn, Norway.

Personal life
Hegh was born in Oslo on 27 April 1960. She is the mother of international handball player Emilie Hegh Arntzen.

References

External links

1960 births
Living people
Norwegian female handball players
Olympic silver medalists for Norway
Olympic handball players of Norway
Handball players at the 1988 Summer Olympics
Norwegian handball coaches
Handball players from Oslo
Norwegian School of Sport Sciences alumni
Olympic medalists in handball
Medalists at the 1988 Summer Olympics